Seven O'Clock was a South Korean boy band formed by Staro Entertainment and KDH Entertainment in 2017. They debuted on March 16, 2017, with Butterfly Effect. They officially disbanded on March 2, 2021.

Career

2017–2018: Butterfly Effect and #7
Seven O'Clock released their debut mini-album Butterfly Effect and its lead single "Echo" on March 16, 2017.

On September 19, 2018, it was announced via their fan café that Vann had left Seven O'Clock, and that the group would now be managed by Forest Network. On September 21, members A-Day and Younghoon changed their stage names to Hangyeom and 2Soul, respectively. Seven O'Clock released their second mini-album #7 and lead single "Nothing Better" on October 8, 2018.

2019–2021 Lineup Changes, "Get Away",  "Highway" and disbandment
On February 8, 2019, Andy was announced as a new member of the group. Seven O'clock released their first digital single "Get Away" on February 21.

On October 4, Forest Network announced the addition of two new members, Rui and Eungyul, while also stating that Jeonggyu, Hyun, and 2Soul would be going on a temporary hiatus to focus on their health. In the meantime, the group would be promoting as five. Four days later, it was announced that 2Soul had recovered from his health issues and would be returning to the group. On October 18, Forest Network announced that Eungyul would not be taking part in Seven O'Clock activities due to personal reasons. They released their third mini-album White Night on November 12, 2019.

On August 29, 2020, Seven O'Clock released their 5th project album Highway with the lead single "Hey There". They hosted their World Live Showcase on the same day.

On March 2, 2021, it was announced that the group has disbanded.

Past members
 Hangyeom (한겸)
 2 Soul (이솔)
 Taeyoung (태영)
 Andy (앤디)
 Rui (루이) 
 Jeonggyu (정규)
 Hyun (현)
 Vaan (반)
 Eungyul (은결)

Discography

Extended plays

Singles

References

External links
 

K-pop music groups
Musical groups established in 2017
South Korean boy bands
South Korean dance music groups
South Korean pop music groups
Musical groups from Seoul
2017 establishments in South Korea
Musical groups disestablished in 2021
2021 disestablishments in South Korea